Prince Hoare is the name of two English artists, both closely related to William Hoare.

Prince Hoare (elder) (1711–1769), sculptor, brother of William Hoare
Prince Hoare (younger) (1755–1834), painter and playwright, son of William Hoare